The Chocolate Cake is a novelty shooter which combines the flavors of Frangelico liqueur, lemon, and white sugar to create the convincing impression of a chocolate cake.  Sucking the sugared lemon tends to concentrate the flavor of the Frangelico.

A popular alternative method is to use lemon vodka and brown or white sugar.   White sugar is more usually available in bars and homes, because brown sugar has a limited open shelf life.

It is advisable for the drink to be "loose strained" (allowing ice chips to fall into the drink) after shaking, so that the "bite" of the alcohol does not overwhelm the experience of the drink.

See also
 List of cocktails

Sources

Cocktails with liqueur